Pedrengo is a comune (municipality) in the Province of Bergamo in the Italian region of Lombardy, located about  northeast of Milan and about  east of Bergamo.

Pedrengo borders the following municipalities: Albano Sant'Alessandro, Gorle, Scanzorosciate, Seriate, Torre de' Roveri.

Pedrengo is famous for the villas that have remained to this day, thanks to noble and wealthy families that in the past centuries have come to the city. This is thanks to the lush green of parks and gardens, as well as large spaces that characterized the city. These villas were the ideal place to spend the summer months and also served as country residences. These are "Villa Sottocasa", "Villa Berizzi" "Villa Frizzoni" and "Palazzo Donadoni".

Demographic evolution

References